Honky Tonk Man may refer to:

The Honky Tonk Man, ring name of professional wrestler Wayne Farris
Honkytonk Man, 1982 American film starring Clint Eastwood
Honky Tonk Man (album), 1975 album by country singer Steve Young
"Honky-Tonk Man", 1956 country song by Johnny Horton, also covered by Bob Luman and Dwight Yoakam